Edith Ballinger Price (1897–1997) was a prolific writer and illustrator of children's books, best known for the imaginative stories and illustrations she created for 37 different books and stories. The granddaughter of landscape painter William Trost Richards, who first inspired her to draw, Price trained at Boston's School of the Museum of Fine Arts, the New York Art Students League and the National Academy of Design. Oft-published in general-interest magazines like Colliers and those aimed at children, like St. Nicholas Magazine, she was also notable as one of the chief founders of the Brownies, the junior version of the Girl Scouts.

Career 
Price's back list includes her first novel Blue Magic (1919), the Bottle Man (1920), Silver Shoal Light, The Happy Venture (1920), and My Lady Lee (1925). She also collaborated with other authors, including Margaret C. Getchell for the 1916 book Cloudbird, the dream-like adventures of a small girl named Dorothy Ann and the animals she meets. For the book, Price's design and illustration appeared in conventional spots at the beginning and end of chapters, as well as in more unexpected places where, depending on the content, small silhouettes of bears, roosters, herons, turtles and other creatures jumped into small spaces within the text itself.

Two years later, Price published Blue Magic, first in serialized form for St. Nicholas Magazine in 1918, then the following year for The Century Company. The playful plot tells the story of seven-year-old Fen, an invalid traveling with his family in Egypt and Italy, but prevented by poor health from leaving their yacht. He is befriended by an old family connection who, to amuse him, pretends to be a blue djinn named Siddereticus.

Other pursuits 
A devotee of the Girl Scouts, she helped found the Brownie Scouts program, which was designed for children not yet old enough to join the Girl Scouts.  She authored their first handbook, as well as several Girl Scout-related magazines, including the American Girl, Girl's Guide Gazette and Girls Today, and she served as the organization's national chair from 1925 to 1932.

Price knew a large number of traditional folk songs, which she was recorded singing by the folklorist Helen Hartness Flanders in 1945. Songs in her repertoire included some of the famous Child Ballads such as "The Two Sisters", "Edward", "The Cruel Brother", "Gypsy Davey" and "Jamie Douglas", all of which can be heard online via the Helen Hartness Flanders Collection.

Gallery 
(Selection was limited by availability.)

References

External links

 Works by or about Edith B. Price in libraries (WorldCat catalog)

Public Domain 

 

 
 The Happy Venture at the Library of Congress

Archives 

 Guide to the Edith Price papers at the University of Oregon

20th-century American women artists
American illustrators
American women illustrators
20th-century American women writers
American children's writers
American centenarians
Women centenarians
1897 births
1997 deaths
American mystery writers
American historical fiction writers
American detective fiction writers
American writers of young adult literature